Joseph Peter Spano (born July 7, 1946) is an American actor best known for his roles as Lt. Henry Goldblume on Hill Street Blues and FBI Special Agent Tobias C. Fornell on NCIS. He also voiced the Chuck E. Cheese (at the time Chuck E. Cheese's Pizza Time Theatre) character, Pasqually the Chef, from 1977–1983.

Career
Spano was a member of the San Francisco improv group The Wing, and in college debuted as Paris in a production of Romeo and Juliet in 1967. In 1968, he helped found the Berkeley Repertory Theatre, appearing in its first production, and stayed with the company for ten years. He moved to Hollywood in the late 1970s, landing guest spots on TV and bit roles in American Graffiti (1973) and The Enforcer (1976).

In Hill Street Blues he played Henry Goldblume during the entire seven-year run of the series, first as a detective sergeant, later as a lieutenant. Goldblume was one of Hill Street precinct captain Frank Furillo's trusted junior officers, serving at times as a hostage negotiator and gangs relations officer. The character was sympathetic to crime victims, sometimes coming in conflict with his duties as a police officer. Spano was one of many actors appearing throughout each episode, which typically had several interwoven story lines.

After Hill Street Blues ended, Spano won recurring roles in television police shows Murder One (1995) and NYPD Blue (1993), again as a detective, and has appeared regularly in television movies and television shows like The X-Files (episodes "Tempus Fugit" and "Max"), Mercy Point and Amazing Grace. Spano won an Emmy award in 1988 for Best Guest Actor in a Drama Series for a role he played in an episode of Midnight Caller. He has appeared in several feature films, including Apollo 13 and Primal Fear. His credits are often confused with Australian actor Joseph Spano. They are not related.

He is a veteran stage actor on the east and west coasts. Spano made his Broadway debut in 1992 in the Roundabout Theater revival of Arthur Miller's The Price, with Eli Wallach, which was nominated for a Tony for Best Revival.  West coast stage credits include Eduardo Pavlovsky's Potestad, and David Mamet's Speed-the-Plow and American Buffalo, for which he was awarded an LA Drama Critics Circle Award. At the Rubicon Theater in Ventura he has played General Burgoyne in George Bernard Shaw's The Devil's Disciple, Greg in A. R. Gurney's Sylvia and Vladimir in Waiting for Godot. He is a member of the Antaeus Theater Company and a founding member of three other theater companies. He played a seductive vampire in the cult musical Dracula: A Musical Nightmare in a small Los Angeles theatre. He also appeared in the TV movie Brotherhood of Justice with Keanu Reeves and Kiefer Sutherland.

He is the voice of the Wild Flower Hotline for the Theodore Payne Foundation, which can be reached by calling (818) 768-1802.

NCIS
Spano has been a recurring character in NCIS since its premiere episode, "Yankee White", playing FBI Special Agent Tobias Fornell, the FBI counterpart to NCIS Special Agent Leroy Jethro Gibbs, portrayed by Mark Harmon. In Season 15, Fornell is no longer with the FBI, but is a private investigator.

Two episodes have used Fornell's personal life as the main crux of an NCIS episode: one where Fornell's daughter is imperiled and another where Fornell's career is imperiled. In each episode, it is the friendship between Gibbs and Fornell which is invoked in order to involve NCIS in the resolution.

Personal life
Spano was born in San Francisco, California, the son of Virginia Jean (née Carpenter) and Vincent Dante Spano, a physician. He graduated from Archbishop Riordan High School in 1963, and he is an honorary member of the House of Russi.  Spano and his wife Joan Zerrien, a therapist, were married in 1980.  They have two adopted daughters.

Filmography

Film and television

 One Is a Lonely Number (1972) as Earl of Kent 
 American Graffiti (1973) as Vic
 Warlock Moon (1973) as John Devers
 The Streets of San Francisco (1974, TV Series) as Taxi Driver - Witness / Toomey
 The Enforcer (1976) as Mitch, Robber (uncredited)
 Northern Lights (1978) as John Sorensen
 Lou Grant (1979, TV Series) as Jack Ridgeway / Larry
 Trapper John, M.D. (1979) as Dr. Gallant
 Roadie (1980) as Ace
 Tenspeed and Brown Shoe (1980) as Duff McCoy
 Fighting Back (1980) as Captain Murphy
 Insight (1981, TV Series) as Karl Rothman
 The Incredible Shrinking Woman (1981) as Guard
 Terminal Choice (1985) as Dr. Frank Holt
 Brotherhood of Justice (1986) as Bob Grootemat
 Hill Street Blues (1981–1987, TV Series) as Lt. Henry Goldblume
 Deep Dark Secrets (1987) as Eric Lloyd
 Valerie (1987) as Mr. Cameron
 L.A. Law (1988, TV Series) as George Ripley
 Disaster at Silo 7 (1988) as Sgt. Swofford
 Midnight Caller (1989) as John Saringo
 Cast the First Stone (1989) as Bill Spencer
 The Easter Story (1990) as Jesus (voice)
 Blind Faith (1990, TV Mini-Series) as Sal Caccaro
 The Girl Who Came Between Them (1990) as Jim
 The Great Los Angeles Earthquake (1990) as Chad Spaulding
 American Dreamer (1990, TV Series)
 The Summer My Father Grew Up (1991) as Louis
 For the Very First Time (1991) as Mr. Allen
 Fever (1991) as Junkman
 Civil Wars (1992, TV Series) as Carl Sherensky
 Bloodlines: Murder In the Family (1993) as Hal Leventhal
 Reasonable Doubts (1993) as Jimmy Cooper
 The Flood: Who Will Save Our Children? (1993) as Richard Koons
 Rave Review (1994) as Lou
 Dream On (1994, TV Series) as Policeman
 Apollo 13 (1995) as NASA Director
 Amazing Grace (1995) as Detective Dominick Corso
 Primal Fear (1996) as Abel Stenner
 Murder One (1996, TV Series) as Ray Velacek
 Her Costly Affair (1995-1996, TV Series) as Carl Weston
 The X-Files (1997, TV Series) as Mike Millar
 A Call To Remember (1997) as Dr. Green
 Profiler (1997–1998, TV Series) as Detective Mike Ramdak
 From the Earth to the Moon (1998, TV Mini-Series) as George Mueller
 JAG (1998, TV Series) as Captain Jack Murphy
 Break Up (1998) as Priest
 Logan's War: Bound by Honor (1998) as Special Agent John Downing
 L.A. Doctors (1998, TV Series) as Don Claybourne
 Nash Bridges (1998, TV Series) as FBI Agent Langdon
 In Quiet Night (1998) as Gold
 Mercy Point (1998–1999, TV Series) as Dr. DeMilla
 A.T.F. (1999) as Senator at Hearing (uncredited)
 Touched by an Angel (1999) as James Cooper
 A Question of Faith (2000) as Duncan
 Batman Beyond  (1999-2000, TV Series) as Bennet / Boss / Sniper (voice)
 Strong Medicine (2000) as Jonathan Freid
 Batman Beyond: Return of the Joker (2000)
 Texas Rangers (2001) as Mr. Dunnison
 Providence (2001, TV Series) as Dr. Carroll
 Ticker (2001) as Captain Spano
 The Invisible Man (2002, TV Series) as Father Tom Moore
 Hart's War  (2002) as Col. J.M. Lange
 Static Shock (2002) as Mr. Osgood
 NYPD Blue (2002-2003, TV Series) as Det. John Clark Sr.
 Boomtown (2003, TV Series) as Henry Stein
 Fortunate Son (2004) as Robert
 L.A. Dragnet (2004, TV Series) as Bill Kutler
 Eyes (2005, TV Series) as Judge William Massey
 Crossing Jordan (2006) as Captain Innis
 The Closer (2006, TV Series) as Dr. Rose
 Hollywoodland (2006) as Howard Strickling
 Standoff (2006, TV Series) as Joe Suser
 Fracture (2007) as Judge Joseph Pincus
 Shark (2008, TV Series) as Paul Faber
 Frost/Nixon (2008) as Network Executive
 In Plain Sight (2010) as Gabe Andrews / Gabe Marion
 If I Did It (2011) as Mayor
 NCIS (2003–present, TV Series) as Senior FBI Agent / Private Investigator Tobias "T.C." Fornell
 The Mentalist (2012, TV Series) as Greg Relin
 NCIS: New Orleans (2014, TV Series) as Senior FBI Agent Tobias "T.C." Fornell
 Pearson (2019, TV Series) as Mr. Allen

Awards and nominations 
Ovation Awards
 2009: Nominated for Lead Actor in a Play for the role of George in the Rubicon Theatre Company production of Who's Afraid of Virginia Woolf?

References

External links
 

1946 births
Living people
Male actors from San Francisco
American male film actors
American male television actors
20th-century American male actors
21st-century American male actors
American male stage actors
American people of Italian descent